Purda  is a village in Olsztyn County, Warmian-Masurian Voivodeship, in northern Poland. It is the seat of the gmina (administrative district) called Gmina Purda. It is located within the historic region of Warmia.

The village has a population of 1,140.

The historic sights of Purda include the Gothic Saint Michael Archangel church, a typical Warmian old wayside shrine and a Catholic cemetery.

The village was founded in 1384. Polish poet and bishop Ignacy Krasicki visited Purda in 1779.

Gallery

References

Purda